Marie Thérèse de Noireterre (1760-1823) was a French miniaturist.

Biography
She was born in 1760 in Paris as daughter of Etienne Charles de Noiretterre and sister of Valentin de Noiretterre,  niece of  ’s wife and perhaps cousin of Guillaume Voiriot ’s brother-in-law. She was one of Adélaïde Labille-Guiard ’s female pupils as  Marie-Gabrielle Capet (1761 - 1818) and she showed miniatures in the Salon de la Correspondance in 1786 and 1787 and in the Salon (Paris) from 1791 to 1803. Her autoportrait at the 1787 exhibition was  previously shown in London, as her reception piece at the Society of Artists  in 1785 where she  appeared, as “Mlle de Noireterre, Paris”. Encouraged by the Society’s corresponding member in Paris, Charles-Étienne Gaucher (1740 – 1804) whom she portrayed in miniature, as well as his wife, she applied for membership in november 1786 in a letter, and was elected unanimously. She lived in Paris first  at 25, rue Mazarine and then 290, rue St Honorè. An inventory in the Archives nationales suggests the date of her death on May 2, 1823.
Among the famous sitters of her miniatures we can remember: Charles-Maurice de Talleyrand-Périgord  (1754 – 1838),   (1771 – 1816),   (1761 – 1819), Marie Salmon  and many others.

Artwork
Her drawing is faultless and she captures the sitter's expression in representing its inner psychological dimension. But the most amazing feature of this work is the great attention of particulars and the sense of realism in the definition of the faces wonderfully modeled through a delicate game of nuances. She used a yellowish colouring with greenish shades and the sitter's darkly underlined eyelashes and dull colours.

Works
 Portrait of a lady, watercolor on ivory, Accorsi - Ometto Museum Turin
 Portrait de François Guillaume Ducray-Duminil, watercolor on ivory, 1787, Louvre
 Portrait of gentleman in Dark Green Coat, c. 1793 watercolour and gouache on ivory, unsigned, The Tansey collection
 Portrait of gentleman (the artist's father), watercolor on ivory
 Portrait of a young gentleman, in red and green checked waistcoat, watercolor on ivory
 Portrait of a lady with a little dog, c. 1805, watercolor on ivory
 Portrait of  Madame Mole-Reymond, (actress) portrayed also by Élisabeth Louise Vigée Le Brun, c. 1784, watercolor and gouache on ivory, unsigned  
 Portrait  of a lady with a white hat, c. 1790, watercolor and gouache on ivory, signed  
 Portrait of a young lady with a Bolognese dog, watercolor and gouache on ivory, unsigned 
 Seven prints after portraits painted by Marie Therese de Noireterre, British Museum 
 Portrait of unknown gentleman, c. 1790, watercolor on ivory, signed, Nationalmuseum Swerige
 Autoportrait, watercolor on ivory, 1795, signed, Nationalmuseum Swerige
 Portrait Mme Cordebar, watercolor on ivory, signed
 Portrait of Antoine Lavoisier (presumed), watercolor on ivory, signed

References 

1760 births
1823 deaths
18th-century French painters
18th-century French women artists
19th-century French painters
19th-century French women artists
Painters from Paris
French portrait painters
Portrait miniaturists
Pupils of Adélaïde Labille-Guiard
French women painters